This article provides information on candidates who stood for the 1943 Australian federal election. The election was held on 21 August 1943.

In 1941, the Lang Labor supporters had rejoined the Australian Labor Party. Their seats are still designated as Lang Labor seats.

By-elections, appointments and defections

By-elections and appointments
On 16 November 1940, Herbert Johnson (Labor) was elected to replace Albert Green (Labor) as the member for Kalgoorlie.
On 21 December 1940, Thomas Marwick (Country) was elected to replace Henry Gregory (Country) as the member for Swan.
On 24 May 1941, Grenfell Price (UAP) was elected to replace John Price (UAP) as the member for Boothby.
On 8 October 1942, Charles Latham (Country) was appointed a Western Australian Senator to replace Bertie Johnston (Country).

Defections
In 1941, Labor MP Maurice Blackburn (Bourke) was expelled from the Labor Party and subsequently sat as an Independent.
In 1941, the Australian Labor Party (Non-Communist) was reabsorbed into the federal Labor Party. Non-Communist members Senator Stan Amour (New South Wales), Senator John Armstrong (New South Wales), Jack Beasley (West Sydney), Dan Mulcahy (Lang), Sol Rosevear (Dalley) and Tom Sheehan (Cook) were all readmitted to the ALP.
In 1943, Country Party MP Thomas Marwick (Swan) left the party to sit as an Independent.
In 1943, Labor Senator Tom Arthur lost his place on the Labor ticket. He contested the election as an Independent.

Retiring Members and Senators

United Australia 
 Sir George Bell MP (Darwin, Tas)
 Senator Alexander McLachlan (SA)

Country 
 Thomas Paterson MP (Gippsland, Vic)

House of Representatives
Sitting members at the time of the election are shown in bold text. Successful candidates are highlighted in the relevant colour. Where there is possible confusion, an asterisk (*) is also used.

New South Wales

Northern Territory

Queensland

South Australia

Tasmania

Victoria

Western Australia

Senate
Sitting Senators are shown in bold text. Tickets that elected at least one Senator are highlighted in the relevant colour. Successful candidates are identified by an asterisk (*).

New South Wales
Three seats were up for election. The Labor Party was defending three seats. Labor Senators James Arnold, Bill Ashley and William Large were not up for re-election.

Queensland
Three seats were up for election. The Labor Party was defending three seats. United Australia Party Senators Thomas Crawford and Harry Foll and Country Party Senator Walter Cooper were not up for re-election.

South Australia
Three seats were up for election. The United Australia Party was defending three seats. United Australia Party Senators James McLachlan, George McLeay and Oliver Uppill were not up for re-election.

Tasmania
Three seats were up for election. The Labor Party was defending three seats. United Australia Party Senators John Hayes, Herbert Hays and Burford Sampson were not up for re-election.

Victoria
Three seats were up for election. The Labor Party was defending two seats. The United Australia Party was defending one seat. United Australia Party Senators Charles Brand and John Leckie and Country Party Senator William Gibson were not up for re-election.

Western Australia
Four seats were up for election. One of these was a short-term vacancy caused by Country Party Senator Bertie Johnston's death; this was filled in the interim by the Country Party's Charles Latham. The Labor Party was defending three seats. The Country Party was defending one seat. United Australia Party Senators Herbert Collett and Allan MacDonald were not up for re-election.

See also
 1943 Australian federal election
 Members of the Australian House of Representatives, 1940–1943
 Members of the Australian House of Representatives, 1943–1946
 Members of the Australian Senate, 1941–1944
 Members of the Australian Senate, 1944–1947
 List of political parties in Australia

References
Adam Carr's Election Archive - House of Representatives 1943
Adam Carr's Election Archive - Senate 1943

1943 in Australia
Candidates for Australian federal elections